Amar Laskri (22 January 1942 – 1 May 2015) was an Algerian film director. He studied theater, radio, television and film in Belgrade.

Born in Aïn Berda, Algeria, he directed several feature films and short films and one episode of television.

Filmography
Feature films
 1969 : Le Communiqué
 1971 : Patrouille à l'est
 1989 : Les Portes du  silence
 1999 : Fleur du Lotus

References

External links

 https://ar.wikipedia.org/wiki/%D8%B9%D9%85%D8%A7%D8%B1_%D8%A7%D9%84%D8%B9%D8%B3%D9%83%D8%B1%D9%8A

1942 births
2015 deaths
Algerian film directors
Algerian filmmakers
21st-century Algerian people